Sporosarcina luteola is a Gram-variable, spore-forming and motile bacterium from the genus of Sporosarcina which has been isolated from equipment used for soy sauce production in Japan.

References 

Bacillales
Bacteria described in 2009